Ralph Bowen (born December 24, 1961) is a Canadian jazz saxophonist.

Biography
Bowen started piano lessons at an early age, with clarinet and saxophone lessons following soon after. At thirteen he led a quartet and performed in big bands in Toronto. As a teenager, he was awarded a grant from the Canada Council for the Arts to study music with Pat LaBarbera and Phil Nimmons at the Banff School of Fine Arts. While in Toronto, he studied with LaBarbera for eight years and developed a long-time association with drummer Keith Blackley and his father, drummer Jim Blackley. He performed and recorded with Canadian fusion group Manteca.

In 1983 and 1984, he was awarded two more grants to pursue his musical studies in at the jazz department at Indiana University, where his teacher was David Baker. In 1985, the same year he and Cecil Taylor were voted Main Jazz Men of the Year by the Toronto Globe and Mail, Bowen won the audition for the Blue Note Records co-leader position of the contemporary all-star New York based jazz band known as Out of the Blue (OTB). He moved to New York and would eventually record four albums for Blue Note.

In 1986, Bowen began to tour with jazz pianist Michel Camilo with whom he recorded a number of albums and soundtracks. Between 1986 and 1991 he completed three world tours with jazz pianist Horace Silver and toured Europe with Jim Beard. He has also worked with Orrin Evans, Jim Trompeter, Renee Rosnes, Earl MacDonald, Ralph Peterson Jr., Charles Fambrough, and Anthony Branker.

Bowen has led the jazz program at Mason Gross School of the Arts at Rutgers University.

Awards and honors
 Silver Disk Award for Best Jazz Album, Japan, OTB by Out of the Blue, 1986
 Canadian Juno Award, Best Mainstream Album, Free Trade wit Peter Leitch, Renee Rosnes, Neil Swainson, Terry Clarke, 1994

Discography

As leader
 Movin' On (Criss Cross, 1992)
 Free Trade with Peter Leitch, Renee Rosnes, Neil Swainson, Terry Clarke (Justin Time, 1994)
 Soul Proprietor (Criss Cross, 2001)
 Keep the Change (Criss Cross, 2003)
 Dedicated (Posi-Tone, 2009)
 Due Reverence (Posi-Tone, 2010)
 Power Play (Posi-Tone, 2011)
 Total Eclipse (Posi-Tone, 2012)
 Standard Deviation (Posi-Tone, 2014)
 Ralph Bowen (Posi-Tone, 2017)
 Five (Criss Cross , 2008)
With Out of the Blue
 O.T.B. (Blue Note, 1985)
 Inside Track (Blue Note, 1986)
 Live at Mt. Fuji (Blue Note, 1987)
 Spiral Staircase (Blue Note, 1989)

As sideman
With Anthony Branker
 Spirit Songs (Sons of Sound, 2006)
 Blessings (Origin, 2009)
 Dance Music (Origin, 2010)
 Dialogic (Origin, 2011)
 Together (Origin, 2012)
 Uppity (Origin, 2013)
 The Forward (Towards Equality) Suite (Origin, 2014)
 Beauty Within (Origin, 2016)

With Michel Camilo
 On the Other Hand (Epic, 1990)
 Amo Tu Cama Rica (Epic 1991)
 One More Once (Columbia, 1994)
 Caribe (Calle, 2009)
 Essence (Sony, 2019)

With Orrin Evans
 Captain Black (Criss Cross, 1998)
 Listen to the Band (Criss Cross, 1999)
 Meant to Shine (Palmetto, 2002)
 Easy Now (Criss Cross, 2005)

With others
 Benny Carter, Harlem Renaissance (MusicMasters, 1992)
 Michael Dease, Reaching Out (Posi-Tone, 2018)
 Charles Fambrough, Keeper of the Spirit (AudioQuest, 1995)
 Conrad Herwig, A Voice Through the Door (Criss Cross, 2012)
 Brian Lynch, Conclave (Criss Cross, 2005)
 Earl MacDonald, Schroeder's Tantrum (Radioland Jazz, 1992)
 Manteca, Strength in Numbers (RCA, 1984)
 Ralph Peterson Jr., Back to Stay (Sirocco Jazz, 1999)
 Renee Rosnes, Renee Rosnes (Blue Note, 1990)
 Jim Rotondi, The Move (Criss Cross, 2010)
 John Serry Jr., Enchantress (Telarc, 1996)
 Horace Silver, Rockin' with Rachmaninoff (2003)

References

Other sources
Richard Skelly, [ Ralph Bowen], at AllMusic

Canadian jazz saxophonists
Male saxophonists
Canadian jazz flautists
Jazz tenor saxophonists
Living people
1961 births
Criss Cross Jazz artists
Posi-Tone Records artists
People from Piscataway, New Jersey
21st-century saxophonists
21st-century Canadian male musicians
Canadian male jazz musicians
Out of the Blue (American band) members
21st-century flautists